David Alerte (born 18 September 1984 in La Trinité, Martinique) is a French sprinter who specializes in the 200 metres.

At the 2006 European Championships in Gothenburg he finished seventh in the 200 metres and won a bronze medal in the 4 x 100 metres relay. He also competed in the 4 × 100 m relay team for France in the 2004 Olympic Games, and in 200 metres at the 2004 World Indoor Championships.

His personal best time is 20.33 seconds, achieved in August 2007 in Niort. He also has 10.27 seconds in the 100 metres, achieved in July 2006 in Dreux, and 46.64 seconds in the 400 metres, achieved in May 2004 in St. George's.

References

External links 
 
 
 
 
 
 

1984 births
Living people
French people of Martiniquais descent
French male sprinters
Athletes (track and field) at the 2004 Summer Olympics
Olympic athletes of France
Martiniquais athletes
People from La Trinité, Martinique
European Athletics Championships medalists